Under Secret Orders, also known as Mademoiselle Doctor, is a 1937 British spy film directed by Edmond T. Gréville and starring Erich von Stroheim, John Loder, Dita Parlo and Claire Luce.  It is an English-language version of the French film Mademoiselle Docteur, also known as Salonique, nid d'espions, and released in the United States as Street of Shadows, which was filmed at the same time under the direction of G. W. Pabst.  Both films have exactly the same plot, but there were differences in the cast between the two: in particular, von Stroheim was not in the French version.

Premise
During the First World War, a woman doctor falls in love with one of her patients who turns out to be a German spy. She herself ends up working for German intelligence.

Cast
 Erich von Stroheim as Col. W. Mathesius / Simonis 
 John Loder as Lt. Peter Carr
 Dita Parlo as Dr. Anne-Marie Lesser 
 Claire Luce as Gaby, Rene's girl 
 Gyles Isham as Lt. Hans Hoffman 
 Clifford Evans as Rene Condoyan 
 John Abbott as Armand 
 Anthony Holles as Mario 
 Edward Lexy as Carr's orderly 
 Robert Nainby as French General
 Bryan Powley as Col. Burgoyne, French Secret Service 
 Molly Hamley-Clifford as Madame Samuloi, Proprietor of the Blue Peacock 
 Raymond Lovell as Col. von Steinberg 
 Frederick Lloyd as Col. Marchand, Carr's boss 
 Claude Horton as Captain Fitzmaurice

Cast notes:
 Stewart Granger appears in a small role

Reception
Writing for Night and Day in 1937, Graham Greene gave the film a poor review, summarizing it as more movie than cinema. Greene described the writing as "a really shocking script, with childish continuity" and criticized the dialogue as "it ambles flatly along".

See also
 Stamboul Quest – 1934 American film starring Myrna Loy
 Mademoiselle Docteur (also known as Salonique, nid d’espions and Street of Shadows) – 1937 French film directed by G.W. Pabst
 Fräulein Doktor – 1969 film, an Italian/Yugoslavian co-production

References

External links

1937 films
British spy thriller films
Films directed by Edmond T. Gréville
World War I spy films
British multilingual films
British black-and-white films
1937 multilingual films
1930s English-language films
1930s British films